Ras-I Luis Dowling (born May 9, 1988) is a former American football safety who is currently the Co-Defensive coordinator and Secondary coach for William & Mary Tribe football. He was drafted by the New England Patriots in the second round of the 2011 NFL Draft. He played college football at Virginia. He has also spent time with the New York Jets and Oakland Raiders.

Early years
Dowling was born in Chesapeake, Virginia.  He attended Deep Creek High School in Chesapeake, where he played defensive back, wide receiver, and some quarterback. As a senior, he recorded 60 tackles and two interceptions as a defensive back. As a receiver he had 14 receptions for 255 yards and four touchdowns.

College career
Dowling attended the University of Virginia.  As a freshman in 2007 Dowling played in 12 games, recording 44 tackles and two interceptions. As a sophomore in 2008 he started nine of 11 games. He finished the season with 43 tackles and a team-leading three interceptions. In 2009 Ras-I Dowling was voted All-ACC second team. He was also awarded ACC Defensive Player of the week vs. Indiana with nine tackles and the first sack of his career. He ended the season with three interceptions. Dowling was voted 2010 Pre-season All-ACC selection and second team All-American for the first time in his career.

Professional career

Pre-draft

New England Patriots
Dowling was selected with the first pick of the second round (33rd overall) by the New England Patriots in the 2011 NFL Draft.

Dowling played two games for the Patriots in the 2011 season before injuring his hip in Week 2 against San Diego. On October 29, 2011, the Patriots placed him on Injured Reserve, ending his 2011 season.

On October 26, 2012, Dowling was placed on injured reserve with a torn thigh muscle, ending his 2012 season. On August 28, 2013, the Patriots released Dowling as part of their roster cutdown to 75 players.

New York Jets
The New York Jets signed Dowling to the practice squad on October 23, 2013. He was released on August 24, 2014.

Oakland Raiders
On September 1, 2014, Dowling was signed to the Raiders' practice squad. On December 13, 2014, the Oakland Raiders signed Dowling to the active roster.

On September 1, 2015, he was released by the Raiders.

Carolina Panthers
On November 23, 2015, Dowling was signed to the Carolina Panthers' practice squad.

On February 7, 2016, Dowling's Panthers played in Super Bowl 50. In the game, the Panthers fell to the Denver Broncos by a score of 24–10.

Coaching career

On January 14, 2019, William & Mary head football coach Mike London hired Dowling to serve as the cornerbacks coach for the William & Mary Football team. After serving as Secondary coach over the next three seasons, Dowling was promoted to Co-Defensive coordinator.

References

External links
Carolina Panthers bio
Virginia Cavaliers bio

1988 births
Living people
Sportspeople from Chesapeake, Virginia
Players of American football from Virginia
American football cornerbacks
American football safeties
Virginia Cavaliers football players
New England Patriots players
New York Jets players
Oakland Raiders players
William & Mary Tribe football coaches